Baap Re Baap (My God!) is a 1955 Hindi family comedy drama film, produced and directed by A. R. Kardar. Produced under the Kardar Productions banner, it had dialogues by S. N. Bannerjee and Jagdish Kanwal. The music of the film was composed by O. P. Nayyar, with the lyrics written by Jan Nisar Akhtar.

Baap Re Baap, a musical comedy, was a great success and brought a big improvement in the career of Kishore Kumar. He acted in a total of sixty-eight films from 1953 to 1968.

The film starred Kishore Kumar, Chand Usmani in lead roles, supported by Smriti Biswas, Jayant, Ulhas, Leela Mishra.

The story revolves around a wealthy young man, whose over-anxious parents try to arrange a prospective bride for him. People from different states in the country answer the matrimonial advertisement, leading to several comedic situations due to the regional and language problems.

Plot
Ashok Sagar (Kishore Kumar) has just returned from abroad after seven years and now lives with his overly protective parents. His one sneeze is treated as if he has pneumonia. After Ashok hears the singing of a girl Kokila (Chand Usmani), who sells flower for living, he falls in love with her. His parents are busy trying to find a suitable bride for him. For this purpose they give an advertisement, which attracts people from various states with differing languages. They all land up at Ashok's house. His parents settle his marriage with Roopa (Smriti Biswas), who comes from a wealthy family (Ulhas and Leela Mishra). Ashok runs away from home and makes his intentions to marry Kokila known to his parents. His mother relents, but his father Raja Bahadur Moti Sagar (Jayant) refuses to budge. With the help of his mother and some planning, Ashok brings Kokila into the house as his bride and his father finally gives his consent.

Cast
 Kishore Kumar as Ashok Sagar
 Chand Usmani as Kokila
 Smriti Biswas as Roopa
 Jayant as Raja Bahadur Moti Sagar
 Ulhas as Colonel Jung Bahadur
 Leela Mishra as Mrs. Jung Bahadur
 S. N. Banerjee as Saligram

Crew
 Producer: A. R. Kardar
 Director: A. R. Kardar
 Studio: Kardar Productions
 Dialogues: S. N. Bannerjee, Jagdish Kanwal
 Music: O. P. Nayyar
 Lyricist: Jan Nisar Akhtar
 Playback Singers: Asha Bhosle, Kishore Kumar
 Cinematographer: Dwarka Divecha
 Editing: M. S. Hajee
 Art and Set Direction: S. N. Desai, G. V. Divkar
 Sound: Ishan Ghosh
 Make-up: Ganpat Kakre
 Choreographer: Surya Kumar

Soundtrack

The music director was O. P. Nayyar, with lyrics written by Jan Nisar Akhtar.

The most popular song is "Piya Piya Piya, Mera Jiya Pukare" by Kishore Kumar & Asha Bhosle, the other hit song is "Raat Rangeeli, Chamke Tare" by Asha Bhosle. Kishore Kumar & Asha Bhosle went on to sing "as many as 687 duets" together.

Tracklist

References

External links
 

1955 films
1950s Hindi-language films
Films directed by A. R. Kardar
Films scored by O. P. Nayyar
Indian black-and-white films
Indian comedy-drama films
1955 comedy-drama films